A Long Weekend in Pest and Buda is a 2003 Hungarian drama film directed by Károly Makk. It was entered into the 25th Moscow International Film Festival.

Cast
 Mari Törőcsik as Török Mari
 Iván Darvas as Drégely Iván
 Eszter Nagy-Kálózy as Török Anna
 Dezső Garas as Pozsár Pál
 Eileen Atkins as Amanda
 Attila Kaszás as Robi
 Emese Vasvári as Nõvér
 Zoltán Seress as Orvos
 Zsuzsa Nyertes as Zsuzsika
 Géza Pártos as Professzor
 Zoltán Gera as Szállodaportás
 Tamás Andor as Csapos
 Imre Csuja as Falusi ember
 János Derzsi as Taxisofõr

References

External links
 

2003 films
2003 drama films
Hungarian drama films
2000s Hungarian-language films
Films directed by Károly Makk